A Christmas stocking is an empty sock or sock-shaped bag that is hung on Saint Nicholas Day or Christmas Eve so that Saint Nicholas (or the related figures of Santa Claus and Father Christmas) can fill it with small toys, candy, fruit, coins or other small gifts when he arrives. These small items are often referred to as stocking stuffers or stocking fillers. The tradition of the Christmas stocking is thought to originate from the life of Saint Nicholas. In some Christmas stories, the contents of the Christmas stocking are the only toys the child receives at Christmas from Santa Claus; in other stories (and in tradition), some presents are also wrapped up in wrapping paper and placed under the Christmas tree. Tradition in Western culture threatens that a child who behaves badly during the year will receive only a piece or pile of coal. Some people even put their Christmas stocking by their bedposts so Santa Claus can fill it by the bed while they sleep.

History

The origin of the Christmas stocking is thought to originate in the life of Saint Nicholas. While there are no written records of the origin of the Christmas Stocking, there are popular legends that attempt to tell the history of this Christmas tradition. One such legend has several variations, but the following is a good example: St. Nicholas was staying with a poor family and heard that the father was planning to sell his three daughters into prostitution to save them all from starvation. St. Nicholas wanted to help, but knew that the old man wouldn't accept charity, so he decided to help in secret. When he left the house after dark he threw three bags of gold through an open window, one landed in a stocking. When the girls and their father woke up the next morning they found the bags of gold and were, of course, overjoyed. The girls were saved from their sad fate. Other versions of the story say that Saint Nicholas threw the three bags of gold directly into the stockings which were hung by the fireplace to dry.

This led to the custom of children hanging stockings or putting out shoes, eagerly awaiting gifts from Saint Nicholas. Sometimes the story is told with gold balls instead of bags of gold. That is why three gold balls, sometimes represented as oranges, are one of the symbols for St. Nicholas. And so, St. Nicholas is a gift-giver. This is also the origin of three gold balls being used as a symbol for pawnbrokers.

A tradition that began in a European country originally, children simply used one of their everyday socks, but eventually special Christmas stockings were created for this purpose. These stockings are traditionally used on Saint Nicholas Day although in the early 1800s, they also came to be used on Christmas Eve.

An unsubstantiated claim is that the Christmas stocking custom derived from the Germanic/Scandinavian figure Odin. According to Phyllis Siefker, children would place their boots, filled with carrots, straw, or sugar, near the chimney for Odin's flying horse, Sleipnir, to eat. Odin would reward those children for their kindness by replacing Sleipnir's food with gifts or candy. This practice, she claims, survived in Germany, Belgium and the Netherlands after the adoption of Christianity and became associated with Saint Nicholas as a result of the process of Christianization. This claim is doubtful as there are no records of stocking filling practices related to Odin until there is a merging of St. Nicholas with Odin. St. Nicholas had an earlier merging with the Grandmother cult in Bari, Italy where the grandmother would put gifts in stockings. This merged St. Nicholas would later travel north and merge with the Odin cults.

Today, stores carry a large variety of styles and sizes of Christmas stockings, and Christmas stockings are also a popular homemade craft. Many families create their own Christmas stockings with each family member's name applied to the stocking so that Santa will know which stocking belongs to which family member.

See also

 Christmas shopping
 Christmas decoration

References

External links

 New York Times – The Christmas Stocking
 Guinness Book of World Records – Largest Christmas Stocking

Stocking
Stocking